The Hauptrogenstein Formation is a geologic formation in Germany and Switzerland. It preserves fossils dating back to the Jurassic period.

See also 
 List of fossiliferous stratigraphic units in Germany

References
 

Geologic formations of Germany
Geologic formations of Switzerland
Jurassic System of Europe
Jurassic Germany
Jurassic Switzerland